Gowzalli or Gowzli may refer to:
 Gowzalli, Ardabil
 Gowzalli, West Azerbaijan